Sun Dawei (born April 1963) is a Chinese politician, and current Deputy Communist Party Secretary of the Guangxi Zhuang Autonomous Region.

Sun was born in Anda, Heilongjiang. He joined the Chinese Communist Party in December 1984, and is a graduate of the Harbin Engineering University, where he majored in management science and engineering. He began work in July 1986. He began his climb on the bureaucratic ladder initially as the head of the Inspection and Quarantine Bureau in Chaoyang District. He then joined the General Administration of Quality Supervision, Inspection and Quarantine as a deputy head, then head, of the inspection supervision department. He was then named executive deputy chair of the Certification and Accreditation Administration of the People's Republic of China, then elevated to chair in 2005.

In 2010, Sun was named deputy chair of AQSIQ, while concurrently holding his role at the Certification and Accreditation Administration.

In June 2017, Sun was transferred to become deputy party chief of the Guangxi Zhuang Autonomous Region.

References

Chinese Communist Party politicians from Heilongjiang
1963 births
Living people
People's Republic of China politicians from Heilongjiang
People from Suihua
Harbin Engineering University alumni